Kärkkäinen is a Finnish surname. Notable people with the surname include:

 Pertti Kärkkäinen (1933–2017), Finnish diplomat
 Veli-Matti Kärkkäinen (born 1958), Finnish theologian
 Katariina Souri (born 1968), Finnish author, original surname Kärkkäinen
 Pyry Kärkkäinen (born 1986), Finnish footballer

Finnish-language surnames